Thomas Wynn, 1st Baron Newborough (1736 – 12 October 1807), known as Sir Thomas Wynn, 3rd Baronet, from 1773 to 1776, was a British politician who sat in the House of Commons between 1761 and 1807.

Career
Wynn was the son of Sir John Wynn, 2nd Baronet. He went to Italy on the "Grand Tour" in 1759–60. He sat as a Member of Parliament for Carnarvonshire from 1761 to 1774, for St Ives from 1775 to 1780 and for Beaumaris from 1796 to 1807. He served as Lord Lieutenant of Carnarvonshire between 1761 and 1781 and raised and commanded the Carnarvon Militia. Wynn succeeded his father in the baronetcy in 1773 and in 1776 he was raised to the Peerage of Ireland as Baron Newborough, of Newborough.<ref name = HOP/

Marriages and children 

Lord Newborough married, firstly, Lady Catherine, daughter of John Perceval, 2nd Earl of Egmont, in 1766. The couple had one child:
 Hon. John Wynn (27 April 1772 – 18 December 1800)

After Lady Catherine's death in 1782, Lord Newborough married, secondly, thirteen-year-old Maria Stella Petronilla, daughter of Lorenzo Chiappini, in 1786; Maria Stella was born at Modigliana, near Forlì (Italy), in 1773. The couple had two sons:
 Thomas John Wynn, 2nd Baron Newborough (3 April 1802 – 15 November 1832)
 Spencer Bulkeley Wynn, 3rd Baron Newborough (23 May 1803 – 1 November 1888)

Lord Newborough died in October 1807 and was succeeded in his titles by his elder son from his second marriage, Thomas. Lady Newborough later remarried and died in 1843.

Notes

References
 Burke's Peerage, Baronetage and Knightage, 100th Edn, London, 1953.
 
Kidd, Charles, Williamson, David (editors). Debrett's Peerage and Baronetage (1990 edition). New York: St Martin's Press, 1990.
 
 Bryn Owen, History of the Welsh Militia and Volunteer Corps 1757–1908: 1: Anglesey and Caernarfonshire, Caernarfon: Palace Books, 1989, ISBN 1-871904-00-5.

1736 births
1807 deaths
Barons in the Peerage of Ireland
Peers of Ireland created by George III
Wynn, Thomas
Wynn, Thomas, 3rd Baronet
British MPs 1774–1780
British MPs 1796–1800
Lord-Lieutenants of Caernarvonshire
Carnarvon Militia officers
Members of the Parliament of Great Britain for English constituencies
Members of the Parliament of Great Britain for Welsh constituencies
Members of the Parliament of the United Kingdom for Welsh constituencies
UK MPs 1801–1802
UK MPs 1802–1806
UK MPs 1806–1807
Members of the Parliament of Great Britain for St Ives
Alumni of Queens' College, Cambridge
Members of the Parliament of the United Kingdom for Beaumaris
Members of the Parliament of Great Britain for Beaumaris